The Florida Marlins' 2007 season was the 15th season for the Major League Baseball (MLB) franchise in the National League. It would begin with the team attempting to improve on their promising 78-84 record in 2006.  Despite the success of the team under manager Joe Girardi, he was fired and replaced with Fredi González.

Marlins general manager Larry Beinfest said that the team's goal from the start of the season was to compete in the playoffs. However, failed to make the playoffs for the 4th consecutive season.

The Marlins had two goals to address during the 2006 offseason: they needed a new closer because '06 closer Joe Borowski signed with the Cleveland Indians as a free agent, and the Marlins saw the need for a new center fielder.  They had platooned Eric Reed, Reggie Abercrombie, Chris Aguila, Cody Ross, and Alfredo Amézaga in the position in 2006, with backup shortstop Amézaga making most of the starts at that position later in the season.  The Marlins had added some new relief pitchers since 2006, trading Chris Resop to the Los Angeles Angels for Kevin Gregg and shipping prospects Jason Vargas and Adam Bostick to the New York Mets for Henry Owens and Matt Lindstrom.  Lindstrom has been a closer during his time in the minors and has a fastball that reached 100 mph on radar guns in winter league play during the 2006 offseason.  The Marlins saw much competition for their closer role, with Ricky Nolasco, Renyel Pinto, Mike Koplove, Gregg, Lindstrom, and Owens all candidates for the job. In April, newly acquired Jorge Julio was named closer, but on May 13, he was traded to the Colorado Rockies for Byung-hyun Kim.

The Marlins signed center fielder Alex Sánchez to a minor league deal in the offseason, who competed for the Marlins' center field job with Reed, Abercrombie, Ross, and Amézaga.  Beinfest said that the Marlins tried to trade for a proven center fielder but were asked for too much in order to get one. However, Sánchez was released at the end of spring training and the starting role was handed to rookie Alejandro De Aza.

Regular season

Season standings

National League East

Record vs. opponents

Game log

|- style="background-color:#bbffbb"
| 1 || April 2 || @ Nationals || 9 - 2 || Willis (1-0) ||Patterson (0-1) || ||40,389 || 1-0
|- style="background-color:#bbffbb"
| 2 || April 3 || @ Nationals || 9 - 3 || Olsen (1-0) || Hill (0-1) || || 20,894 || 2-0
|- style="background-color:#ffbbbb"
| 3 || April 4 || @ Nationals || 7 - 6 || Rauch (1-0) || Julio (0-1) || || 18,835 || 2-1
|- style="background-color:#ffbbbb"
| 4 || April 6 || Phillies || 8 - 2 || Moyer (1-0) || Mitre (0-1) || || 40,397 || 2-2
|- style="background-color:#bbffbb"
| 5 || April 7 || Phillies || 8 - 5 || Willis (2-0) || Myers (0-1) || || 32,419 || 3-2
|- style="background-color:#bbffbb"
| 6 || April 8 || Phillies || 6 - 4 || Olsen (2-0) || Segovia (0-1) || Gardner (1) || 16,308 || 4-2
|- style="background-color:#bbffbb"
| 7 || April 9 || Brewers || 5 - 3 || Sánchez (1-0) || Suppan (0-2) || Owens (1) || 11,157 || 5-2
|- style="background-color:#ffbbbb"
| 8 || April 10 || Brewers || 3 - 2*  || Dessens (1-0) || Pinto (0-1) || Cordero (2) || 10,883 || 5-3
|- style="background-color:#ffbbbb"
| 9 || April 11 || Brewers || 5 - 2 || Bush (1-1) || Mitre (0-2) || Cordero (3) || 11,379 || 5-4
|- style="background-color:#bbffbb"
| 10 || April 13 || @ Braves || 11 - 4 || Willis (3-0) || Redman (0-2) || || 33,212 || 6-4
|- style="background-color:#bbbbbb"
| -- || April 14 || @ Braves || colspan=5|Postponed (rain)  || 6-4
|- style="background-color:#ffbbbb"
| 11 || April 15 || @ Braves || 8 - 4 || Hudson (2-0) || Olsen (2-1) || || 25,189 || 6-5
|- style="background-color:#ffbbbb"
| 12 || April 16 || @ Astros || 4 - 3 || Qualls (2-1) || Gregg (0-1) || || 30,665 || 6-6
|- style="background-color:#ffbbbb"
| 13 || April 17 || @ Astros || 6 - 1 || Oswalt (3-0) || Julio (0-2) || || 38,106 || 6-7
|- style="background-color:#ffbbbb"
| 14 || April 18 || Mets || 9 - 2 || Maine (2-0) || Willis (3-1) || || 17,219 || 6-8
|- style="background-color:#ffbbbb"
| 15 || April 19 || Mets || 11 - 3 || Hernández (2-1) || VandenHurk (0-1) || || 11,815 || 6-9
|- style="background-color:#ffbbbb"
| 16 || April 20 || Nationals || 6 - 5  || Colomé (2-0) || Gardner (0-1) || Rivera (1) || 16,469 || 6-10
|- style="background-color:#bbffbb"
| 17 || April 21 || Nationals || 9 - 3 || Sánchez (2-0) || Chico (1-2) || || 24,107 || 7-10
|- style="background-color:#bbffbb"
| 18 || April 22 || Nationals || 12 - 6 || Obermueller (1-0) || Williams (0-3) || Gregg (1) || 18,443 || 8-10
|- style="background-color:#bbffbb"
| 19 || April 23 || Braves || 8 - 7 || Willis (4-1) || Davies (0-1) || Pinto (1) || 13,227 || 9-10
|- style="background-color:#ffbbbb"
| 20 || April 24 || Braves || 11 - 6 || Moylan (1-0) || Lindstrom (0-1) || || 11,507 || 9-11
|- style="background-color:#bbffbb"
| 21 || April 25 || Braves || 4 - 3 || Owens (1-0) || Wickman (1-1) || || 13,310 || 10-11
|- style="background-color:#ffbbbb"
| 22 || April 27 || @ Phillies || 6 - 5 || Gordon (1-1) || Messenger (0-1) || || 32,331 || 10-12
|- style="background-color:#bbffbb"
| 23 || April 28 || @ Phillies || 11 - 5 || Willis (5-1) || Eaton (2-2) || || 36,914 || 11-12
|- style="background-color:#ffbbbb"
| 24 || April 29 || @ Phillies || 6 - 1 || Moyer (3-1) || Obermueller (1-1) || || 45,107 || 11-13
|- style="background-color:#bbffbb"
| 25 || April 30 || @ Mets ||9 - 6 || Olsen (3-1) || Park (0-1) || Owens (2) || 39,383 ||12-13
|-
| colspan=8 | *Game suspended, completed April 11

|- style="background-color:#bbffbb"
| 26 || May 1 || @ Mets || 5 - 2 ||Nolasco (1-0) || Pelfrey (0-3) || Owens (3) || 48,458 || 13-13
|- style="background-color:#ffbbbb"
| 27 || May 2 || @ Mets || 6 - 3 || Pérez (3-2) || Sánchez (2-1) || Wagner (5) || 25,236 || 13-14
|- style="background-color:#bbffbb"
| 28 || May 4 || Padres || 5 - 4 || Tankersley (1-0) || Linebrink (1-1) || Owens (4) || 24,691 || 14-14
|- style="background-color:#ffbbbb"
| 29 || May 5 || Padres || 7 - 6  || Hampson (1-1) || Gardner (0-2) || Hoffman (7) || 21,381 || 14-15
|- style="background-color:#ffbbbb"
| 30 || May 6 || Padres || 3 - 1 || Peavy (4-1) || Olsen (3-2) || Hoffman (8) || 15,310 || 14-16
|- style="background-color:#ffbbbb"
| 31 || May 7 || Dodgers || 6 - 1 || Penny (4-0) || Nolasco (1-1) || || 12,252 || 14-17
|- style="background-color:#bbffbb"
| 32 || May 8 || Dodgers || 6 - 5 || Owens (2-0) || Broxton (1-1) || || 11,124 || 15-17
|- style="background-color:#ffbbbb"
| 33 || May 9 || Dodgers || 5 - 3 || Tomko (1-3) || Willis (5-2) || Saito (10) || 12,213 || 15-18
|- style="background-color:#bbffbb"
| 34 || May 10 || Dodgers || 3 - 0 || Tankersley (2-0) || Lowe (3-4) || || 20,345 || 16-18
|- style="background-color:#ffbbbb"
| 35 || May 11 || @ Nationals || 6 - 0 || Hill (3-3) || Olsen (3-3) || || 23,006 || 16-19
|- style="background-color:#ffbbbb"
| 36 || May 12 || @ Nationals || 7 - 3 || Rauch (2-0) || Tankersley (2-1) || || 19,278 || 16-20
|- style="background-color:#ffbbbb"
| 37 || May 13 || @ Nationals || 6 - 4 || Simontacchi (1-1) || Obermueller (1-2) || Rauch (1) || 20,486 || 16-21
|- style="background-color:#ffbbbb"
| 38 || May 14 || @ Pirates || 7 - 0 || Gorzelanny (5-2) || Willis (5-3) || || 12,958 || 16-22
|- style="background-color:#bbffbb"
| 39 || May 15 || @ Pirates || 9 - 3 || Mitre (1-2) || Maholm (2-5) || || 12,769 || 17-22
|- style="background-color:#bbffbb"
| 40 || May 16 || @ Pirates || 4 - 3 || Tankersley (3-1) || Capps (2-1)|| Gregg (2) || 15,086 || 18-22
|- style="background-color:#ffbbbb"
| 41 || May 17 || @ Pirates || 7 - 2 || Chacón (1-0) || Nolasco (1-2)|| || 9,582 || 18-23
|- style="background-color:#bbffbb"
| 42 || May 18 || @ Devil Rays || 8 - 4 || Kim (2-2) || Jackson (0-6) || || 13,003 || 19-23
|- style="background-color:#bbffbb"
| 43 || May 19 || @ Devil Rays || 7 - 2 || Willis (6-3) || Seo (2-4) || || 19,566 || 20-23
|- style="background-color:#bbffbb"
| 44 || May 20 || @ Devil Rays || 4 - 3 || Mitre (2-2) || Shawn Camp (0-1) || Gregg (3) || 23,554 || 21-23
|- style="background-color:#bbffbb"
| 45 || May 22 || Phillies || 5 - 3 || Olsen (4-3) || Hamels (6-2) || Gregg (4) || 11,162 || 22-23
|- style="background-color:#ffbbbb"
| 46 || May 23 || Phillies || 8 - 7  || Condrey (2-0) || Gregg (0-2) || || 11,575 || 22-24
|- style="background-color:#bbffbb"
| 47 || May 24 || Phillies || 5 - 4  || Gardner (1-2) || Rosario (0-3) || || 11,811 || 23-24
|- style="background-color:#ffbbbb"
| 48 || May 25 || Mets || 6 - 2 || Heilman (5-2) || Pinto (0-2) || || 24,278 || 23-25
|- style="background-color:#ffbbbb"
| 49 || May 26 || Mets || 7 - 2 || Maine (6-2) || Obermueller (1-3) || || 34,505 || 23-26
|- style="background-color:#ffbbbb"
| 50 || May 27 || Mets || 6 - 4 || Sosa (4-1) || Olsen (4-4) || Wagner (12) || 23,622 || 23-27
|- style="background-color:#bbffbb"
| 51 || May 28 || @ Cubs || 5 - 1 || Kim (3-2) || Marshall (0-2) || Gregg (5) || 41,630 || 24-27
|- style="background-color:#bbffbb"
| 52 || May 29 || @ Cubs || 9 - 4 || Willis (7-3) || Marquis (5-2) || Gregg (6) || 39,788 || 25-27
|- style="background-color:#bbffbb"
| 53 || May 30 || @ Cubs || 9 - 0 || Messenger (1-1) || Lilly (4-3) || || 36,699 || 26-27
|- style="background-color:#ffbbbb"
| 54 || May 31 || @ Brewers || 4 - 3 || Villanueva (4-0) || Lindstrom (0-2) || Cordero (19) || 17,704 || 26-28

|- style="background-color:#ffbbbb"
| 55 || June 1 || @ Brewers || 8 - 5 || Suppan (7-5) || Olsen (4-5) || Cordero (20) || 30,852 || 26-29
|- style="background-color:#bbffbb"
| 56 || June 2 || @ Brewers || 5 - 2 || Lindstrom (1-2) || Capellán (0-1) || Gregg (7) || 42,250 || 27-29
|- style="background-color:#ffbbbb"
| 57 || June 3 || @ Brewers || 3 - 0 || Sheets (6-3) || Willis (7-4) || Cordero (21) || 43,172 || 27-30
|- style="background-color:#bbffbb"
| 58 || June 4 || @ Braves || 6 - 4 || Obermueller (2-3) || Hudson (6-4) || Gregg (8) || 22,175 || 28-30
|- style="background-color:#ffbbbb"
| 59 || June 5 || @ Braves || 3 - 1 || Carlyle (1-1) || Pinto (0-3) || Wickman (10) || 20,863 || 28-31
|- style="background-color:#bbffbb"
| 60 || June 5 || @ Braves || 4 - 2 || VandenHurk (1-1) || Smoltz (7-3) || || 27,072 || 29-31
|- style="background-color:#bbffbb"
| 61 || June 6 || @ Braves || 7 - 4 || Miller (1-0) || Davies (3-4) || Gregg (9) || 28,026 || 30-31
|- style="background-color:#bbffbb"
| 62 || June 8 || Devil Rays || 14 - 8 || Miller (2-0) || Stokes (2-6) || || 13,520 || 31-31
|- style="background-color:#ffbbbb"
| 63 || June 9 || Devil Rays || 7 - 2 || Shields (6-0) || Willis (7-5) || || 20,189 || 31-32
|- style="background-color:#ffbbbb"
| 64 || June 10 || Devil Rays || 9 - 4 || Sonnanstine (1-0) || VandenHurk (1-2) || || 11,525 || 31-33
|- style="background-color:#bbffbb"
| 65 || June 12 || Indians || 3 - 0 || Olsen (5-5) || Carmona (7-2) || Gregg (10) || 15,144 || 32-33
|- style="background-color:#ffbbbb"
| 66 || June 13 || Indians || 7 - 3 || Lee (3-4) || Kim (3-3) || || 13,805 || 32-34
|- style="background-color:#ffbbbb"
| 67 || June 14 || Indians || 3 - 2 || Stanford (1-0) || Willis (7-6) || Borowski (19) || 23,811 || 32-35
|- style="background-color:#ffbbbb"
| 68 || June 15 || @ Royals || 6 - 2 || Meche (4-6) || Mitre (2-3) || Dotel (4) || 28,015 || 32-36
|- style="background-color:#bbffbb"
| 69 || June 16 || @ Royals || 9 - 8 || VandenHurk (2-2) || de la Rosa (4-7) || Gregg (11) || 24,323 || 33-36
|- style="background-color:#ffbbbb"
| 70 || June 17 || @ Royals || 5 - 4 || Bannister (5-6) || Olsen (5-6) || Dotel (5) || 19,433 || 33-37
|- style="background-color:#ffbbbb"
| 71 || June 18 || @ White Sox || 10 - 6 || Contreras (5-7) || Johnson (0-1) || Jenks (18) || 36,132 || 33-38
|- style="background-color:#bbffbb"
| 72 || June 19 || @ White Sox || 7 - 5 || Benítez (1-3) || Thornton (2-3) || Gregg (12) || 35,327 || 34-38
|- style="background-color:#bbffbb"
| 73 || June 20 || @ White Sox || 5 - 4 || Tankersley (4-1) || Garland || Gregg (13) || 32,007 || 35-38
|- style="background-color:#bbffbb"
| 74 || June 22 || Twins || 5 - 4 || Benítez (2-3) || Rincón (2-1) || Gregg (14) || 15,271 || 36-38
|- style="background-color:#ffbbbb"
| 75 || June 23 || Twins || 11 - 1 || Silva (5-8) || Johnson (0-2) || || 21,368 || 36-39
|- style="background-color:#ffbbbb"
| 76 || June 24 || Twins || 7 - 4 || Santana (8-6) || Kim (3-4) || || 15,035 || 36-40
|- style="background-color:#ffbbbb"
| 77 || June 26 || Pirates || 3 - 2 || Maholm (4-10) || Willis (7-7) || Capps (6) || 11,044 || 36-41
|- style="background-color:#ffbbbb"
| 78 || June 27 || Pirates || 7 - 5  || Chacon (4-1) || Gregg (0-3) || Capps (7) || 11,222 || 36-42
|- style="background-color:#bbffbb"
| 79 || June 28 || Pirates || 9 - 7 || Olsen (6-6) || Duke (3-7) || || 31,628 || 37-42
|- style="background-color:#ffbbbb"
| 80 || June 29 || Braves || 12 - 3 || James (7-7) || Johnson (0-3) ||  || 17,181 || 37-43
|- style="background-color:#ffbbbb"
| 81 || June 30 || Braves || 6 - 5 || Hudson (8-5) || Benítez (2-4) || Yates (1) || 24,229 || 37-44

|- style="background-color:#bbffbb"
| 82 || July 1 || Braves || 6 - 5  || Gardner (2-2) || Soriano (2-1) || || 14,311 || 38-44
|- style="background-color:#ffbbbb"
| 83 || July 2 || @ Padres || 3 - 1 || Wells (4-5) || Mitre (2-4) || Hoffman (24) || 25,857 || 38-45
|- style="background-color:#bbffbb"
| 84 || July 3 || @ Padres || 6 - 4 || Miller (3-0) || Maddux (7-5) || Gregg (16) || 34,488 || 39-45
|- style="background-color:#ffbbbb"
| 85 || July 4 || @ Padres || 1 - 0 || Bell (2-2) || Lindstrom (1-3) || || 27,941 || 39-46
|- style="background-color:#bbffbb"
| 86 || July 5 || @ Padres || 3 - 2 || Kim (4-4) || Peavy (9-3) || Gregg (17) || 32,496 || 40-46
|- style="background-color:#bbffbb"
| 87 || July 6 || @ Dodgers || 6 - 5  || Pinto (1-3) || Tomko (1-7) || Gregg (18) || 51,050 || 41-46
|- style="background-color:#bbffbb"
| 88 || July 7 || @ Dodgers || 7 - 2 || Mitre (3-4) || Lowe (8-8) || || 46,177 || 42-46
|- style="background-color:#ffbbbb"
| 89 || July 8 || @ Dodgers || 9 - 3 || Hendrickson (3-4) || Olsen (6-7) || || 44,021 || 42-47
|- style="background-color:#ffbbbb"
| 90 || July 13 || Nationals || 14 - 10 || Rivera (3-2) || Willis (7-8) || || 11,438 || 42-48
|- style="background-color:#bbffbb"
| 91 || July 14 || Nationals || 5 - 2 || Mitre (4-4) || Chico (4-6) || Gregg (19) || 21,012 || 43-48
|- style="background-color:#bbffbb"
| 92 || July 15 || Nationals || 5 - 3 || Olsen (7-7) || Simontacchi (6-7) || Gregg (20) || 12,119 ||44-48
|- style="background-color:#ffbbbb"
| 93 || July 16 || Cardinals || 5 - 3 || Looper (7-7) || Kim (4-5) || Isringhausen (18) || 13,827 || 44-49
|- style="background-color:#bbffbb"
| 94 || July 17 || Cardinals || 4 - 0 || VandenHurk (3-2) || Thompson (6-4) || || 12,475 || 45-49
|- style="background-color:#ffbbbb"
| 95 || July 18 || Cardinals || 6 - 0 || Wells (4-12) || Willis (7-9) || || 12,819 || 45-50
|- style="background-color:#ffbbbb"
| 96 || July 19 || Reds || 7 - 5 || Coffey (2-1) || Benítez (2-5) || Weathers (19) || 10,344 || 45-51
|- style="background-color:#bbffbb"
| 97 || July 20 || Reds || 10 - 2 || Olsen (8-7) || Lohse (5-12) || || 15,313 || 46-51
|- style="background-color:#bbffbb"
| 98 || July 21 || Reds || 11 - 1 || Kim (5-5) || Livingston (2-1) || || 21,823 || 47-51
|- style="background-color:#bbffbb"
| 99 || July 22 || Reds || 9 - 3 || Pinto (2-3) || Arroyo (4-11) || || 14,123 || 48-51
|- style="background-color:#ffbbbb"
| 100 || July 23 || @ Diamondbacks || 4 - 3 ||Davis (7-10) || Willis (7-10) || Valverde (31) || 19,620 || 48-52
|- style="background-color:#ffbbbb"
| 101 || July 24 || @ Diamondbacks || 9 - 3 || Hernández (6-6) || Mitre (4-5) || || 21,035 || 48-53
|- style="background-color:#ffbbbb"
| 102 || July 25 || @ Diamondbacks || 7 - 0 || Webb (9-8) || Olsen (8-8) || || 20,154 || 48-54
|- style="background-color:#ffbbbb"
| 103 || July 26 || @ Diamondbacks || 7 - 4 || Peña (5-2) || Benítez (2-6) || || 18,721 || 48-55
|- style="background-color:#ffbbbb"
| 104 || July 27 || @ Giants || 12 - 10 || Chulk (4-2) || Pinto (2-4) || ||42,831 || 48-56
|- style="background-color:#ffbbbb"
| 105 || July 28 || @ Giants || 4 - 3 || Taschner (2-0) || Gregg (0-4) || || 43,001 || 48-57
|- style="background-color:#bbffbb"
| 106 || July 29 || @ Giants || 8 - 5 || Mitre (5-5) || Morris (7-7) || Gregg (21) || 42,965 || 49-57
|- style="background-color:#ffbbbb"
| 107 || July 31 || Rockies || 6 - 3 || Cook (8-6) || Olsen (8-9) || Corpas (7) || 11,534 || 49-58

|- style="background-color:#bbffbb"
| 108 || August 1 || Rockies || 4 - 3 || Kim (6-5) || Fogg (5-7) || Gregg (22) || 11,556 || 50-58
|- style="background-color:#ffbbbb"
| 109 || August 2 || Rockies || 4 - 3 || Hawkins (2-5) || Benítez (2-7) || Corpas (8) || 11,927 || 50-59
|- style="background-color:#ffbbbb"
| 110 || August 3 || Astros || 8 - 2 || Oswalt (11-6) || Willis (7-11) || || 15,226 || 50-60
|- style="background-color:#bbffbb"
| 111 || August 4 || Astros || 6 - 5  || Gardner (3-2) ||  Randolph (0-1) || || 22,112 || 51-60
|- style="background-color:#bbffbb"
| 112 || August 5 || Astros || 6 - 5 || Olsen (9-9) || Albers (2-5) || Gregg (23) || 14,622 || 52-60
|- style="background-color:#ffbbbb"
| 113 || August 7 || @ Phillies || 11 - 1 || Moyer (10-8) || VandenHurk (3-3) || Durbin (1) || 32,791 || 52-61
|- style="background-color:#ffbbbb"
| 114 || August 8 || @ Phillies || 6 - 4 || Lohse (7-12) || Willis (7-12) || Myers (8) || 34,139 || 52-62
|- style="background-color:#bbffbb"
| 115 || August 9 || @ Phillies || 4 - 2 || Tankersley (5-1) || Myers (2-4) || Gregg (24) || 37,009 || 53-62
|- style="background-color:#bbffbb"
| 116 || August 10 || @ Mets || 4 - 3 || Lindstrom (2-3) || Wagner (1-1) || Gregg (25) || 48,516 || 54-62
|- style="background-color:#bbffbb"
| 117 || August 11 || @ Mets || 7 - 5 || Miller (4-0) || Heilman (7-4) || Gregg (26) || 50,773 || 55-62
|- style="background-color:#ffbbbb"
| 118 || August 12 || @ Mets || 10 - 4 || Sosa (8-6) || Gardner (3-3) || || 51,023 || 55-63
|- style="background-color:#bbffbb"
| 119 || August 14 || Diamondbacks || 14 - 5  || Willis (8-12) || Kim (6-6) || || 10,610 || 56-63
|- style="background-color:#ffbbbb"
| 120 || August 15 || Diamondbacks || 9 - 6 || Davis (10-10) || Mitre (5-6) || Valverde (36) || 11,472 || 56-64
|- style="background-color:#ffbbbb"
| 121 || August 16 || Diamondbacks || 5 - 4 || Hernández (9-7) || Barone (0-1) || Valverde (37) || 11,516 || 56-65
|- style="background-color:#ffbbbb"
| 122 || August 17 || Giants || 3 - 0 || Zito (9-11) || Olsen (9-10) || Hennessey (10) || 25,079 || 56-66
|- style="background-color:#ffbbbb"
| 123 || August 18 || Giants || 4 - 3 || Cain (5-13) || VandenHurk (3-4) || Hennessey (11) || 42,817 || 56-67
|- style="background-color:#ffbbbb"
| 124 || August 19 || Giants || 6 - 5 || Chulk (5-4) || Gardner (3-4) || Hennessey (12) || 15,351 || 56-68
|- style="background-color:#ffbbbb"
| 125 || August 20 || Giants || 8 - 7 || Taschner (3-1) || Wolf (0-1) || Wilson (1) || 10,907 || 56-69
|- style="background-color:#ffbbbb"
| 126 || August 21 || @ Cardinals || 5 - 2 || Percival (3-0) || Benítez (2-8) || Isringhausen (24) || 42,059 || 56-70
|- style="background-color:#ffbbbb"
| 127 || August 22 || @ Cardinals || 6 - 4 || Springer (6-1) || Olsen (9-11) || Isringhausen (25) || 42,147 || 56-71
|- style="background-color:#bbffbb"
| 128 || August 23 || @ Cardinals || 11 - 3 || VandenHurk (4-4) || Reyes (2-13) || || 42,123 || 57-71
|- style="background-color:#ffbbbb"
| 129 || August 24 || @ Reds || 5 - 3 || Harang (13-3) || Willis (8-13) || Weathers (28) || 25,773 || 57-72
|- style="background-color:#ffbbbb"
| 130 || August 25 || @ Reds || 11 - 7 || Belisle (7-8) || Mitre (5-7) || || 32,288 || 57-73
|- style="background-color:#ffbbbb"
| 131 || August 26 || @ Reds || 9 - 3 || Shearn (1-0) || Barone (0-2) || || 23,122 || 57-74
|- style="background-color:#ffbbbb"
| 132 || August 27 || Braves || 13 - 2 || Cormier (1-4) || Olsen (9-12) || || 11,716 || 57-75
|- style="background-color:#bbffbb"
| 133 || August 28 || Braves || 4 - 3  || Kim (7-6) || Villarreal (2-2) || || 11,539 || 58-75
|- style="background-color:#ffbbbb"
| 134 || August 29 || Braves || 7 - 4 || Carlyle (8-5) || Willis (8-14) || Soriano (6) || 12,633 || 58-76
|- style="background-color:#ffbbbb"
| 135 || August 31 || Phillies || 9 - 2 || Kendrick (8-3) || Mitre (5-8) || || 15,231 || 58-77

|- style="background-color:#bbffbb"
| 136 || September 1 || Phillies || 12 - 6 || Kim (8-6) || Durbin (6-4) || Gregg (27) || 24,651 || 59-77
|- style="background-color:#bbffbb"
| 137 || September 2 || Phillies || 7 - 6 || Miller (5-0) || Davis (0-1) || Gregg (28) || 12,334 || 60-77
|- style="background-color:#ffbbbb"
| 138 || September 3 || @ Nationals || 6 - 3 || Bergmann (3-5) || VandenHurk (4-5) || Cordero (30) || 27,592 || 60-78
|- style="background-color:#ffbbbb"
| 139 || September 4 || @ Nationals || 4 - 3 || Schroder (2-1) || Gregg (0-5) || || 15,611 || 60-79
|- style="background-color:#ffbbbb"
| 140 || September 5 || @ Nationals || 6 - 4 || Ayala (1-2) || Lindstrom (2-4) || Cordero (31) || 19,222 || 60-80
|- style="background-color:#bbffbb"
| 141 || September 7 || @ Phillies || 6 - 3 || Kim (9-6) || Durbin (6-5) || Gregg (29) || 38,696 || 61-80
|- style="background-color:#ffbbbb"
| 142 || September 8 || @ Phillies || 9 - 1 || Condrey (5-0) || VandenHurk (4-6) || || 38,559 || 61-81
|- style="background-color:#ffbbbb"
| 143 || September 9 || @ Phillies || 8 - 5 || Moyer (13-11) || Willis (8-15) || Myers (15) || 32,574 || 61-82
|- style="background-color:#ffbbbb"
| 144 || September 10 || Nationals || 5 - 4 || Hill (4-3) || Olsen (9-13) || Cordero (33) || 12,345 || 61-83
|- style="background-color:#bbffbb"
| 145 || September 11 || Nationals || 13 - 8 || Lindstrom (3-4) || Schroder (2-2) || || 11,078 || 62-83
|- style="background-color:#bbffbb"
| 146 || September 12 || Nationals || 5 - 4  || Barone (1-2) || Rivera (4-6) || || 10,121 || 63-83
|- style="background-color:#bbffbb"
| 147 || September 14 || @ Rockies || 7 - 6 || Willis (9-15) || Herges (4-1) || Gregg (30) || 22,400 || 64-83
|- style="background-color:#bbffbb"
| 148 || September 15 || @ Rockies || 10 - 2 || Kensing (1-0) || Jiménez (3-4) || || 26,079 || 65-83
|- style="background-color:#ffbbbb"
| 149 || September 16 || @ Rockies || 13 - 0 || Morales (2-2) || Olsen (9-14) || || 19,161 || 65-84
|- style="background-color:#ffbbbb"
| 150 || September 17 || @ Braves || 11 - 6 || Smoltz (14-7) || Kim (9-7) || || 20,957 || 65-85
|- style="background-color:#ffbbbb"
| 151 || September 18 || @ Braves || 4 - 3 || Reyes (1-2) || Seddon (0-1) || Soriano (7) || 22,076 || 65-86
|- style="background-color:#ffbbbb"
| 152 || September 19 || @ Braves || 5 - 1 || James (11-10) || Barone (1-3) || || 24,449 || 65-87
|- style="background-color:#bbffbb"
| 153 || September 20 || Mets || 8 - 7  || Tankersley (6-1) || Sosa (9-8) || || 15,132 || 66-87
|- style="background-color:#ffbbbb"
| 154 || September 21 || Mets || 9 - 6 || Martínez (3-0) || Olsen (9-15) || Schoeneweis (1) || 25,666 || 66-88
|- style="background-color:#ffbbbb"
| 155 || September 22 || Mets || 7 - 2 || Pérez (15-9) || Kim (9-8) || || 22,517 || 66-89
|- style="background-color:#ffbbbb"
| 156 || September 23 || Mets || 7 - 6  || Smith (3-1) || García (0-1) || Schoeneweis (2) || 17,130 || 66-90
|- style="background-color:#bbffbb"
| 157 || September 25 || Cubs || 4 - 2 || Willis (10-15) || Lilly (15-8) || Tankersley (1) || 16,044 || 67-90
|- style="background-color:#bbffbb"
| 158 || September 26 || Cubs || 7 - 4 || Kensing (2-0) || Marquis (12-9) || Gardner (2) || 19,051 || 68-90
|- style="background-color:#bbffbb"
| 159 || September 27 || Cubs || 6 - 4 || Olsen (10-15) || Trachsel (7-11) || Gregg (31) || 24,809 || 69-90
|- style="background-color:#bbffbb"
| 160 || September 28 || @ Mets || 7 - 4 || Kim (10-8) || Pérez (15-10) || Gregg (32) || 55,298 || 70-90
|- style="background-color:#ffbbbb"
| 161 || September 29 || @ Mets || 13 - 0 || Maine (15-10) || Seddon (0-2) || || 54,675 || 70-91
|- style="background-color:#bbffbb"
| 162 || September 30 || @ Mets || 8 - 1 || Kensing (3-0) || Glavine (13-8) || || 54,453 || 71-91

Roster

Player stats

Batting

Starters by position
Note: Pos = Position; G = Games played; AB = At bats; H = Hits; Avg. = Batting average; HR = Home runs; RBI = Runs batted in

Other batters
Note: G = Games played; AB = At bats; H = Hits; Avg. = Batting average; HR = Home runs; RBI = Runs batted in

Pitching

Starting pitchers
Note: G = Games pitched; IP = Innings pitched; W = Wins; L = Losses; ERA = Earned run average; SO = Strikeouts

Other pitchers
Note: G = Games pitched; IP = Innings pitched; W = Wins; L = Losses; ERA = Earned run average; SO = Strikeouts

Relief pitchers
Note: G = Games pitched; W = Wins; L = Losses; SV = Saves; ERA = Earned run average; SO = Strikeouts

Draft
This is a partial list. For the full draft, see here.

Players Selected

Farm system

References

Game Logs:
1st Half: Florida Marlins Game Log on ESPN.com
2nd Half: Florida Marlins Game Log on ESPN.com
Batting Statistics: Florida Marlins Batting Stats on ESPN.com
Pitching Statistics: Florida Marlins Pitching Stats on ESPN.com

2007 Florida Marlins at Baseball Reference

Miami Marlins seasons
Florida Marlins season
Miami